Panj Mahall (also Romanized as Panj Maḩal and Panj Maḩall) is a village in Shapur Rural District, in the Central District of Kazerun County, Fars Province, Iran. At the 2006 census, its population was 121, in 22 families.

References 

Populated places in Kazerun County